Leslie John Witts  (1898–1982) was a British physician and pioneering haematologist.

Biography
L. J. Witts received secondary education at Boteler Grammar School, where he won in 1916 a scholarship to the University of Manchester. During WWI when he reached the age of 18 he joined the Inns of Court Officers Training Corps and then the Royal Field Artillery. Serving on the western front, he suffered a leg wound and was invalided back to civilian life. From 1919 to 1923 he studied at the University of Manchester, graduating there MB ChB in 1923. After house appointments, he became Dickinson travelling scholar of the University of Manchester and graduated there in 1926 with his higher MD thesis on blood research. He qualified MRCP in 1926.

In 1926 Howard Florey became a Fellow of Gonville and Caius College, Cambridge and vacated his John Lucas Walker Studentship at the University of Cambridge. This studentship was filled by Witts, who worked from 1926 to 1928 in the department of pathology of the University of Cambridge.

In 1931 he was elected FRCP. In 1932 he gave the Goulstonian Lectures on Pathology and treatment of anaemia. After junior appointments in Cambridge, in the US, and at Guy's Hospital, he was appointed in 1933 a full physician and in 1935 a professor of medicine at St Bartholomew's Hospital.

From 1933 to 1937 at St Bartholomew's Hospital, Leslie Witts closely collaborated with the surgical unit, which was directed by James Paterson Ross. In 1937 Witts was appointed the first Nuffield professor of clinical medicine at the University of Oxford. He held the professorship until retirement in 1965 with successor Paul Beeson. For about 30 years Witts ran the weekly post-graduate case conferences at the Radcliffe Infirmary.

In 1937 he was a co-founder of the British Society of Gastroenterology along with Arthur Frederick Hurst, John Ryle, Henry Letheby Tidy, and Lionel Hardy. Witts wrote about his opinions on medicine as ‘Doctor Don’ in 1939 in The Lancet and, years later, in the ‘Personal Views’ series in the British Medical Journal.

He was appointed CBE in 1959. Under the auspices of the Royal College of Physicians, he delivered in 1961 the Lumleian Lectures on Some aspects of the pathology of anaemia and in 1971 the Harveian Oration on The medical professorial unit.

In 1929 in Cambridge he married Nancy Grace Salzman (1907–1992), younger daughter of the historian Louis Francis Salzman. When L. J. Witts died in 1982 he was survived by his widow, one son, three daughters, and ten grandchildren.

Selected publications

Articles

 (Harveian Oration)

Books

References

External links

1898 births
1982 deaths
British haematologists
British gastroenterologists
20th-century English medical doctors
People educated at Boteler Grammar School
Alumni of the University of Manchester
Academics of the Medical College of St Bartholomew's Hospital
Academics of the University of Oxford
Commanders of the Order of the British Empire
Royal Field Artillery officers
Fellows of the Royal College of Physicians